The Liechtenstein City Palace is a residential building at  9, in the first district of Vienna, Innere Stadt. The palace was built from 1692 to 1705 by the Italian architect Domenico Martinelli and the Swiss architect .

The building is one of two palaces in Vienna belonging to the princely family of Liechtenstein. The other grand house still owned by the family in Vienna is the Liechtenstein Garden Palace.

The palace escaped destruction during World War II, when bombs fell nearby. It is still used as a private residence by the princely family. After restoration in 2013, the building contains the 19th century portion of the princely art collection, whereas artworks from the 16th to 18th centuries are displayed at the Liechtenstein Garden Palace.


Gallery

References

Further reading 
 Reuss, Matthias, Antonio Belluccis Gemäldefolge für das Stadtpalais Liechtenstein in Wien. Studien zur Kunstgeschichte, vol. 126. Hildesheim: G. Olms.

External links

 
 

Palaces in Vienna
House of Liechtenstein
Buildings and structures in Innere Stadt
Houses completed in 1705
1705 establishments in Austria
Neoclassical architecture in Austria